Olav Neuland (often spelled wrongly Olev Neuland; 29 April 1947 Viljandi – 21 May 2005 Anija) was an Estonian film director.

Filmography
 "Tuulte pesa" (1979)
 "Corrida" (1982)
 "Reekviem" (1984)
 "Hundiseaduse aegu" (1984)
 "Näkimadalad" (1988) (short series)

References

1947 births
2005 deaths
Estonian film directors
People from Viljandi
Burials at Pärnamäe Cemetery